Cimarron City is a town in Logan County, Oklahoma, United States. The population was 150 at the 2010 census, a 39.4 percent gain over the figure of 110 in 2000. It is part of the Oklahoma City Metropolitan Statistical Area. Cimarron City is a combination bedroom and retirement community.

History
Cimarron City is a planned community that was founded in July 1973 by real estate developers. J. L. Swaim, a former Oklahoma resident residing in Chico, California, and real estate dealer Don McLaughlin, of Oklahoma City. Leon Spitz, an Oklahoma City engineer, designed the residential section. The community grew slowly, as homes were constructed for families and retirees who wanted to live amid a rural ambience. Residents who still work typically must commute to Oklahoma City, Guthrie, Edmond or Crescent. It incorporated in 1974, and was named for the Cimarron River, which flows through the southwestern part of the town.

Geography
Cimarron City is located at  (35.884999, −97.602874).

Demographics

As of the census of 2000, there were 110 people, 44 households, and 30 families residing in the town. There were 49 housing units at an average density of 30.8 per square mile (11.9/km2). The racial makeup of the town was 90.91% White, 1.82% African American, 4.55% Native American, 0.91% from other races, and 1.82% from two or more races. Hispanic or Latino of any race were 1.82% of the population.

There were 44 households, out of which 34.1% had children under the age of 18 living with them, 54.5% were married couples living together, 9.1% had a female householder with no husband present, and 31.8% were non-families. 27.3% of all households were made up of individuals, and 6.8% had someone living alone who was 65 years of age or older. The average household size was 2.50 and the average family size was 3.03.

In the town, the population was spread out, with 28.2% under the age of 18, 2.7% from 18 to 24, 28.2% from 25 to 44, 30.9% from 45 to 64, and 10.0% who were 65 years of age or older. The median age was 40 years. For every 100 females, there were 120.0 males. For every 100 females age 18 and over, there were 125.7 males.

The median income for a household in the town was $34,219, and the median income for a family was $50,625. Males had a median income of $30,938 versus $9,583 for females. The per capita income for the town was $17,380. There were 10.3% of families and 14.3% of the population living below the poverty line, including 31.3% of under eighteens and 14.3% of those over 64.

Culture

The community was the fictional 1888 setting for the 1967–68 United States television series Cimarron Strip starring actor Stuart Whitman as a U.S. Marshal. However, in the film series the show's creator placed the community closer to the Cimarron Strip or Cherokee Strip of the Indian Territory panhandle area near the Cimarron River. Another U.S. dramatic television program, titled Cimarron City (TV series) (1958–60), was also set in the town.

References

External links
 Encyclopedia of Oklahoma History and Culture – Cimarron City

Oklahoma City metropolitan area
Towns in Logan County, Oklahoma
Towns in Oklahoma
Populated places established in 1974